The 1995 Kentucky Derby was the 121st running of the Kentucky Derby. The race took place on May 6, 1995. There were 144,110 in attendance. Winning horse Thunder Gulch was the first in Kentucky Derby history to win after starting in the number 16 post.

Payout
The 121st Kentucky Derby Payout Schedule

 $2 Exacta: (11-10)  Paid   $480.00
 $2 Trifecta: (11-10-2)  Paid   $2,099.20

Full results

References

1995
Kentucky Derby
Derby
Kentucky
Kentucky Derby